Swanwick is an unincorporated community in Ray County, in the U.S. state of Missouri and part of the Kansas City metropolitan area.

History
A post office called Swanwick was established in 1872, and remained in operation until 1902. A railroad employee gave the community the name of his wife, Swan Gower.

References

Unincorporated communities in Ray County, Missouri
Unincorporated communities in Missouri